Pluchea dentex is a plant in the Asteraceae family, first described in 1867 by George Bentham, from specimens collected in Queensland by Robert Brown at Broad Sound and Thirsty Sound,  by Ferdinand von Mueller at the source of the Gilbert River, and one by Eugene Fitzalan at Port Denison.

It is found in New South Wales, South Australia, Western Australia, Queensland and the Northern Territory.

References

External links
Pluchea dentex occurrence data from Australasian Virtual Herbarium

dentex
Flora of Queensland
Flora of the Northern Territory
Flora of Western Australia
Flora of New South Wales
Flora of South Australia
Plants described in 1869
Taxa named by George Bentham